The 2016 Samarkand Challenger was a professional tennis tournament played on clay courts. It was the 20th edition of the tournament which was part of the 2016 ATP Challenger Tour. It took place in Samarkand, Uzbekistan between 9 and 14 May 2016.

Singles main-draw entrants

Seeds

 1 Rankings are as of May 2, 2016.

Other entrants
The following players received wildcards into the singles main draw:
  Sanjar Fayziev
  Temur Ismailov
  Shonigmatjon Shofayziyev
  Pavel Tsoy

The following players received entry from the qualifying draw:
  Bar Tzuf Botzer
  Mikhail Elgin
  Markos Kalovelonis
  Francesco Vilardo

Champions

Singles

 Karen Khachanov def.  Rubén Ramírez Hidalgo, 6–1, 6–7(6–8), 6–1

Doubles

 Denis Matsukevich /  Andrei Vasilevski def.  Hsieh Cheng-peng /  Yang Tsung-hua, 6–4, 5–7, [10–5]

External links
Official Website

Samarkand Challenger
Samarkand Challenger
2016 in Uzbekistani sport
May 2016 sports events in Asia